Jibek Joly TV, previously CaspioNet, Kazakh TV and Qazaq TV, is the first national satellite TV channel of the Khabar Agency, the largest media company in the Republic of Kazakhstan. The channel's first programme was broadcast on 25 October 2002 under the name of CaspioNet. The principal mission of Kazakh TV is to present a complete picture of Kazakhstan and Central Asia to foreign viewers. In August 2022, Qazaq TV was renamed to Jibek Joly TV.

Jibek Joly TV broadcasts informative and educational programmes 24 hours a day in Kazakh, Russian, English, Kyrgyz and Uzbek.

Broadcasting
In conjunction with the major satellite operators Eutelsat and Orange S.A., the channel transmits its signal to 93 countries throughout North America, Central America, Western Europe, Eastern Europe, North Africa, the Middle East, Central Asia and Transcaucasia.  It has a potential audience of 253 million households.

Satellites: Intelsat 904 (Katelco Plus), Eutelsat (SESAT), Astra 3A (Kabel Deutschland), Hot Bird 8, and as of November 2011 Galaxy 19 97 West.

Programming
It provides relevant and objective information about Kazakhstan and Central Asia. The channel broadcasts the main local and international news as well as information about major political, economic and sporting events. The schedules are completed by documentaries, classical and contemporary feature films, children's films, programmes of historical and ethnographic interest, and also views of the most interesting events in the cultural life of the country. These may include theatre performances and various exhibitions.

References

External links

Television stations in Kazakhstan
Government-owned companies of Kazakhstan
Television channels and stations established in 2002
Satellite television
International broadcasters
2002 establishments in Kazakhstan